Palau–Serbia relations are the bilateral relations between Palau and Serbia. Both nations are members of the United Nations.

History
Formal bilateral relations between the two states were established in January 2019 during the first visit of President of Palau Thomas Remengesau Jr. to Belgrade. The relations were established in the context of the decision of Palau to withdraw its recognition of Kosovo which followed the same decision by Papua New Guinea, Solomon Islands and some other countries. Palau initially recognized Kosovo in March 2009 as the 56th state to do so. Serbian Minister of Foreign Affairs Ivica Dačić expressed self-criticism and regret that after the death of Josip Broz Tito and Breakup of Yugoslavia his country failed to maintain its friendly relations with Pacific nations. Dr Nina Markovic, a sessional lecturer at Macquarie University expressed her belief that the formal relations will bring Serbian support for Pacific nations within the United Nations forums on issues related to effects of climate change on island nations.

See also 
Politics of global warming
Climate Vulnerable Forum
Eastern European Group

Notes and references

Notes

References 

Serbia
Palau